Flesh, Blood, & Videotape is the 2nd video album from the rock band Poison, featuring the singles / music videos from Poison's 3rd studio album Flesh & Blood and also features behind the scenes footage and in depth interviews.
The album titled track and single "(Flesh & Blood) Sacrifice" featured a music video which was initially banned from MTV due to its explicit nature and was eventually released on this compilation.

The video compilation was re-released on DVD in 2001 as part of Poison Greatest Video Hits, which received US Gold certification in 2003.

Track listing
 Let It Play (Montage clip)
 Unskinny Bop
 Ride the Wind
 Poor Boy Blues (Montage clip)
 Something To Believe In
 Life Goes On
 (Flesh & Blood) Sacrifice

Band members
 Bret Michaels - lead vocals
 C.C. DeVille - lead guitar
 Bobby Dall - bass
 Rikki Rockett - drums

References

External links
Official website
Poison Colombia
Poison Mexico

1991 video albums
Music video compilation albums
Poison (American band) video albums
1991 compilation albums